Joseph Aloysius Mowry (April 6, 1908 – February 9, 1994) was an outfielder in Major League Baseball. He played for the Boston Braves.

References

External links

1908 births
1994 deaths
Major League Baseball outfielders
Boston Braves players
Minor league baseball managers
Baseball players from St. Louis